Jeremy Newman (born 16 February 1961) is a British sailor. He competed in the Tornado event at the 1988 Summer Olympics.

References

External links
 

1961 births
Living people
British male sailors (sport)
Olympic sailors of Great Britain
Sailors at the 1988 Summer Olympics – Tornado
Sportspeople from Colchester